A by-election was held for the Australian House of Representatives seat of Griffith on 20 May 1939. This was triggered by the death of Labor Party MP Frank Baker.

The election was won by Labor candidate William Conelan by eight votes.

Immediately after Baker's death, there was some speculation that Queensland premier, William Forgan Smith would contest the by-election.

Results

See also 
 List of Australian federal by-elections

References 

1939 elections in Australia
Queensland federal by-elections
1930s in Queensland